I Love Mama (stylized "I LOVE mama") was a gyaru fashion and lifestyle magazine published monthly in Japan by Inforest Publishing.

Originally named "Mama Nuts × Ageha", I Love Mama was established as a special edition of two gyaru magazines, the hostess-targeted Koakuma Ageha magazine and dark-skin obsessed Happie Nuts magazine.

I Love Mama was considered a unique magazine, as it was a magazine especially for "gyaru-mama", women who remain gyaru after pregnancy, consisting of the likes of housekeeping tips, parenting tips, and fashion tips.

Described as a "mega-hit" magazine, it has been the highest-selling gyaru-mama magazine ever since its launch in 2008.

History
I Love Mama was first published in September 2008 under the name "Mama Nuts × Ageha" as a special co-edition of Koakuma Ageha and Happie Nuts, after these two magazines' special editorials for "gyaru-mama" audiences gained considerable popularity. Mama Nuts × Ageha was the first-ever magazine devoted solely to the gyaru-mama scene, and it became a smash-hit, with 150,000 copies sold during its first three days and an additional 30,000 copies sold. Mama Nuts × Ageha changed its name to "I Love Mama", becoming monthly in April 2009. Circulation reached 200,000 by October 2009.

Following the closure of Inforest Publishing I Love Mama ended publication in 2014.

Models
The most notable trait of the models appearing in I Love Mama is that most of them appear in the magazine with their children. The children in the magazine are called the "chibiko".
Exclusive models are officially called the "Love-mo". Irregularly-appearing models are officially called the "Love-mama".

"Love-mo" : Ako Hina, Chika Kiguchi, Satomi Daikuhara, Hanako Noda, Yukari Shirai, Saori Nakamoto, Chika Arai, Kyo Son , Ayaka Shirato
"Love-mama" : Maho Ohshiro, Ayane Kubo, Saki Kawabata, Yukari Nakatsu, Akari Suzuki, Ai Hotta, Mariko Mizuno, Naho Mishima, Hiromi Sayama

References

External
Official 
Official (Inforest) 

2008 establishments in Japan
2014 disestablishments in Japan
Defunct women's magazines published in Japan
Fashion magazines published in Japan
Gyaru
Lifestyle magazines published in Japan
Magazines established in 2008
Magazines disestablished in 2014
Monthly magazines published in Japan
Women's fashion magazines